The 2015–16 Árabe Unido season is the club's 22nd season of existence. The Panamanian outfit will be playing in the Liga Panameña. Outside of the Liga, Unido will also be playing in the CONCACAF Champions League.

Competitions

Liga Panameña

Apertura

CONCACAF Champions League

Group H table

Results

References 

Panamanian football clubs 2015–16 season
C.D. Árabe Unido seasons